The 2001 World Table Tennis Championships men's doubles was the 46th edition of the men's doubles championship.
Wang Liqin and Yan Sen won the title after defeating Kong Linghui and Liu Guoliang in the final by three sets to nil.

Results

See also
List of World Table Tennis Championships medalists

References

-